The Diocese of Brandon is a diocese of the Ecclesiastical Province of Rupert's Land of the Anglican Church of Canada. The Rt. Rev'd William Grant Cliff, (formerly Rector of the Collegiate Chapel of St John the Evangelist at Huron University College, and Canon Precentor of the Diocese of Huron) was elected as the 7th Bishop on October 31, 2015, and was consecrated on March 1, 2016. Its cathedral is St. Matthew's Cathedral in Brandon, which was established in 1952.

The first synod of the diocese of Brandon was held on 24 June 1924. St Matthew's church in Brandon was declared a pro-cathedral in May, 1945 and upgraded to full cathedral status on October 5, 1952. The then rector of St Matthew's, the Reverend B.O. Whitfield, was appointed the first Dean of Brandon in 1957.

Bishops of Brandon

Deans of Brandon
The Dean of Brandon is also the Rector of St Matthew's Cathedral.

Source: Diocese of Brandon

Notes

Anglican bishops of Brandon
Brandon, Anglican Diocese of
Anglican Province of Rupert's Land